The 1981 Avon Championships World Championship Series was the 10th season since the foundation of the Women's Tennis Association. It commenced on January 4, 1981, and concluded on December 19, 1981, after 36 events. The Avon Championships World Championship Series was the elite tour for professional women's tennis organised by the Women's Tennis Association (WTA). The year is divided into two sponsors with the first three months sponsored by Avon Series and the latter part by Toyota Series. It included the four Grand Slam tournaments and a series of other events. ITF tournaments were not part of the tour, although they awarded points for the WTA World Ranking.

Schedule 
The table below shows the 1981 Avon Championships World Championship Series schedule.

Key

January

February

March

April

May

June

July

August

September

October

November

December

Toyota Series

Points system 
The 31 Toyota Series tournaments were divided into eight point categories. The highest points were allocated to the Grand Slam tournaments; French Open, the Wimbledon Championships, the US Open and the Australian Open. Points were allocated based on these categories and the finishing position of a player in a tournament. The points allocation, with doubles points listed in brackets, is as follows:

Rankings 
Below are the 1981 WTA year-end rankings (December 31, 1981) in both singles and doubles competition:

See also 
 1981 Volvo Grand Prix
 Women's Tennis Association
 International Tennis Federation

References

External links 
 Official WTA Tour website

 
WTA Tour
1981 WTA Tour